Domenico Bernini (16571723) was the son of the artist Gian Lorenzo Bernini.

Born on 3 August 1657, Domenico was the last of the eleven children born to the famed seventeenth-century artist Gian Lorenzo Bernini and his wife Caterina Tezio.  A scholar and author, Domenico Bernini published several works related to the history of the Catholic Church.  Published in four volumes, History of the Heresies perhaps is the best known of his writings.  Domenico's biography of his father, Vita del Cavalier Gio. Lorenzo Bernini, appeared in Rome in 1713 and is now available in its first English translation and critical edition. It is one of the most important, full-length primary sources for the life of Gian Lorenzo Bernini.  Domenico Bernini died in 1723.

Although he had a very brief career as a Jesuit novice (1671–73), Domenico was never ordained a priest; he married sometime after 1686 and had three children. He is frequently confused in older scholarship with his eldest brother, Monsignor Pietro Filippo who became a prelate and canon of Santa Maria Maggiore in Rome. He devoted himself to the study of ecclesiastical history and wrote an extensive history of Catholic heresies.

References 

Gian Lorenzo Bernini
Historians of the Catholic Church
Italian biographers
Male biographers
Italian male writers
1657 births
1723 deaths